Incident is a 1948 American film noir directed by William Beaudine and featuring Warren Douglas, Jane Frazee and Robert Osterloh.

Plot
A man is mistaken for a hoodlum and beaten up, leading him to a sordid web of violence and danger.

Cast
 Warren Douglas as Joe Downey
 Jane Frazee as Marion Roberts
 Robert Osterloh as James "Slats" Slattery
 Joyce Compton as Joan
 Anthony Caruso as Nails
 Harry Lauter as Bill 
 Eddie Dunn as Lt. Madigan
 Meyer Grace as Knuckles Morgan
 Harry Cheshire as Hartley
 Lynn Millan as Sally O'Brien
 Robert Emmett Keane as Rinsel
 Pierre Watkin as C. W. Sloan

Reception
Film historian and critic Hal Erickson said of the film: "Incident is one of the slicker directorial accomplishments of B-picture maestro William 'One Take' Beaudine."

References

External links
 
 
 
 

1949 films
1940s thriller films
American thriller films
American black-and-white films
Film noir
Monogram Pictures films
Films directed by William Beaudine
1940s English-language films
1940s American films